Andrew Zorard (Hungarian: Zoerárd András, Szórád, Zoárd; Polish: Andrzej Świerad, Żurawek, Żórawek, Świrad, and Wszechrad; Slovak: Svorad, Andrej Svorad, Czech: Sverad; German: Zoërard, Latin: Zoerardus) was a Benedictine monk originating from Poland but active in Slovakia (then Hungary), who is venerated as a saint in the Catholic Church and the Orthodox Churches

Life
Zorard was born around 980 in Opatowiec, a small village in Poland. A tradition in the small village of Tropie holds that in his youth he lived near there as a monk. At around the year 1000, at about the age of 20, he began living as a hermit and a missionary, evangelizing in Olawa, Silesia (modern Poland). At some time, he also traveled to northern Hungary (Slovakia)

Around the year 1003 Zorard settled in St. Hippolytus Monastery on Mt. Zobor near Nitra - then part of the Kingdom of Hungary, present day Slovakia. He became a Benedictine monk in the Abbey. He took the name "Andrew". There he became the spiritual guide of Benedict of Skalka. Zorard and Benedict, with the permission of their superior Philip, later left the monastery and became hermits in a cave along the Váh River near Skalka nad Váhom not far from Trenčín. Andrew died of natural causes around 1009. He practiced such severe austerities that, according to legend, the iron chain, which he wore wrapped around the belt, eventually grew into his body.

Benedict continued to live in the cave for three years until he was murdered by a gang of thieves looking for treasure. In 1083 Zorard's relics were transferred to St. Emmeram's Cathedral in Nitra where they remain to this day. A biography of Benedict and Zorard was written by Maurus of Nitra, Bishop of Pécs, in which it says that Zorard led a hermit life living in a small cave near the monastery. The cave has since been called Svoradova (Zorard's).

Feast Day and veneration

Andrew is venerated especially in Slovakia, Hungary, and Poland, but also in diaspora communities of the United States. His feast day is 17 July, but in some calendars he is venerated together with Benedict on 13 June.

King Géza I of Hungary declared him one of the patron saints of Hungary. Zorard died around 1009. As early as 1064, Géza took the first steps towards his canonization. The cult of Zorard was officially confirmed in July 1083 by Pope Gregory VII, thanks to the Hungarian King Ladislaus I. Zorard's remains are located in the St. Emmeram's Cathedral in Nitra.

References

Further reading
Hoffmann H.: Die Heilige Zoerad. Archiv für schlesische Kirchengeschichte 3. 1938, p. 283-286.
Semkowicz Władysław: Andrzej Świerad. In: Polski Słownik Biograficzny. Vol. 1. 1935, p. 100-101.
Silnicki T.: Dzieje Kościoła na Śląsku. Warszawa 1953, p. 25, 94.
Wędzki Andrzej: Andrzej-Świerad. In: Słownik Starożytności Słowiańskich. Vol. 1961, p. 24-25.
Wojciechowski Tadeusz: Eremici reguły św. Romualda. In: Szkice historyczne XI wieku. Kraków 1904, p. 53-58.

External links
 Saint Benedict of Szkalka at Patron Saints Index
 Andreas Zorard 
 Svorad and Benedikt 

Slovak Roman Catholic saints
Polish Roman Catholic saints
Hungarian Roman Catholic saints
11th-century Christian saints
Medieval Hungarian saints
10th-century Polish people
11th-century Polish people
11th-century Hungarian people
Hungarian hermits